The Yekaterinburg City Duma is the city duma of Yekaterinburg, Russia. A total of 36 deputies are elected for five-year terms.

History
Yekaterinburg's city duma was originally established in 1785 as part of Catherine II's reforms on local government, with the first meeting being held in 1787.

Elections

2018

See also
November 1917 Yekaterinburg City Duma election

References

Yekaterinburg